This is a list of inventions and foods named after places.

A-G

 Adirondack chair – Adirondack mountains, US
 Adirondack guideboat – Adirondack mountains, US
 Angostura bitters – Angostura, now called Ciudad Bolivar, Venezuela
 Arbroath smokie – Arbroath, Scotland
 Axminster carpet – Axminster, Somerset, UK
 Badminton game – Badminton, Gloucestershire, UK 
 Bahian guitar – Bahia, Brazil
 Bakewell tart – Bakewell, Derbyshire, UK 
 Balaclava – Balaklava, Crimea, Ukraine 
 Balmoral bonnet – Balmoral, Scotland
 Balmoral shoe – Balmoral, Scotland
 Bánh mì – Saigon, Vietnam
 Bangalore torpedo – Bangalore, India
 Bath bun – Bath, Somerset, UK 
 Belfast truss – Belfast, Northern Ireland 
 Berlin – Berlin, Germany
 Bikini – Bikini Atoll, Marshall Islands 
 Blackpool rock – Blackpool, Lancashire, UK
 Bordeaux mixture – Bordeaux, France
 Bristol board – Bristol, UK
 Brummagem Ware – Birmingham, UK
 Bungalow – Bengal, India 
 Cambric – Cambrai, France known as Kameryk in Dutch 
 Camembert – Camembert, Orne, France 
 Calico – Kozhikode, Kerala, India known as Calicut 
 Cape cart – Cape of Good Hope
 Champagne – Champagne, France
 Chelsea bun – Chelsea, London, UK
 Chorley cake – Chorley, Lancashire, UK
 Chicago screw – Chicago, Illinois, US
 China - China
 Cologne - Cologne, Germany
 Cognac – Cognac, France
 Concord coach – Concord, New Hampshire, US
 Corinthian bronze – Corinth, Greece 
 Cornish pasty – Cornwall, UK
 Damascus steel – Damascus, Syria
 Damask – Damascus, Syria
 Delftware – Delft, Netherlands 
 Denim – Nimes, France 
 Dresden porcelain – Dresden, Germany
 Denver boot – Denver, US
Duffel Bag – Duffel, Belgium
 Dum-dum bullet – Dum Dum, West Bengal, India 
 Dymkovo toy – Dymkovo settlement, Russia
 Eccles cake – Eccles, Greater Manchester, UK
 Elswick cruiser – Elswick, Tyne and Wear
 Eton crop – Eton, Berkshire, UK 
 Eton mess – Eton College, Eton, Berkshire, UK
 Fedoskino miniature – Fedoskino, Russia
 Fez – Fez, Morocco
 Finnan haddie – Findon, Aberdeenshire, Scotland 
 French horn - France
 Frankfurter – Frankfurt, Germany
 Gordian knot – Gordium, Turkey

H-Q

 Hackney carriage – Hackney, London
 Hamburger – Hamburg, Germany
 Harris tweed – Harris, Outer Hebrides, Scotland
 Homburg – Bad Homburg, Germany
 Jeans – Genoa, Italy
 Jodhpurs – Jodhpur, India
 Jena glass – Jena, Germany
 Jersey barrier – New Jersey, US
 Jersey (clothing), Jersey (fabric) – Jersey
 Kentucky rifle – Kentucky, US
 Khokhloma – Khokhloma settlement, Nizhny Novgorod Oblast, Russia
 Lancashire boiler – Lancashire, UK
 Landau – Landau, Germany
 Leyden jar – Leiden, Netherlands 
 Limerick – Limerick, Ireland
 Limousine – Limousin, France 
 Lincoln green – Lincoln, UK
 Macassar oil – Makassar, Indonesia
 Madeira Islands — Madeira Islands via Madeira wine
 Madeira wine — Madeira Islands
 Magenta – Magenta, Lombardy
 Marathon race – Marathon, Greece
 Mayonnaise – Mahón, Menorca, Spain
 Muscovy glass – Moscow, Russia
 Nankeen – Nanking, China
 Norfolk wherry – Norfolk, UK
 Orenburg shawl – Orenburg, Russia
 Oxford bags – Oxford, UK
 Oxford brogues – Oxford, UK
 Panama hat – Panama
 Paris Green – Paris, France
 Parchment – Pergamon, Turkey 
 Pilsner – Pilsen, Czech Republic
 Plaster of Paris – Paris, France
 Polonium – Poland
 Pomfret Cakes – Pontefract, Yorkshire, UK
 Port wine – Porto, Portugal
 Portland cement – Isle of Portland, Dorset, UK

R-Z

 Roman candle (firework) – Rome, Italy
 Rugby football – Rugby, Warwickshire, UK 
 Russian guitar – Russia
 Russian Mountains – Russia
 Samian ware – Samos, Greece
 Sherry – Jerez de la Frontera, Spain 
 Sienna – Siena, Italy
 Surrey (carriage) – Surrey, UK
 Trojan horse – Troy, Turkey
 Tula pryanik – Tula, Russia
 Tulle (netting) – Tulle, France
 Venetian blind – Venice, Italy
 Venetian glass – Venice, Italy
 Yorkshire pudding – Yorkshire, UK
 Worcester sauce – Worcester, UK 
 Worsted – Worstead, Norfolk, UK 
 Zhostovo painting – Zhostovo, Russia

See also
 List of inventions named after people
 List of inventors
 List of inventors killed by their own inventions

References

Place names
Named after places